Oltinkoʻl is an urban-type settlement of Qoʻngʻirot District in Karakalpakstan in Uzbekistan. Its population was 20,463 people in 1989, and 28,300 in 2016.

References

Populated places in Karakalpakstan
Urban-type settlements in Uzbekistan